M-20, M-220 and M222 were a range of general-purpose computers designed and manufactured in the USSR.
These computers were developed by the Scientific Research Institute of Electronic Machines (NIIEM) and built
at Moscow Plant of Calculating and Analyzing Machines (SAM) and 
the Kazan Plant of Computing Machines (under the Ministry of Radio Industry of the USSR).

Operating systems
The operating system provided batch processing and simultaneous execution, subsequently enhanced to provide a multitasking mode.
 OS4-220 – for the М-220 
 DM-222 – for the М-222

Available programming languages
 FORTRAN – an optimized ALPHA translator – by A.P. Ershov
 ALGOL 60 – compiler
 ALGOL 68 – compiler, written in ALGOL 60

See also
 The Association of M-20 Users – a M-20 software distributor

Further reading
 L.N. Korolyov. The computer structures and their software base. Moscow, Nauka, 1974.
 Electronic digital computation machines for general purposes. Vol. 4. NII EIR Publication, 1972.

External links
 http://www.computer-museum.ru/english/m220.htm

Ministry of Radio Industry (USSR) computers